Veltruby is a municipality and village in Kolín District in the Central Bohemian Region of the Czech Republic. It has about 1,400 inhabitants.

Administrative parts
The village of Hradišťko I is an administrative part of Veltruby.

References

Villages in Kolín District